Helga Anders (11 January 1948 – 30 March 1986) was an Austrian actress.

She was born Helga Scherz in Innsbruck, to an Austrian father and a German mother, and she grew up in Ruhpolding and Bielefeld after her parents divorced. She made her stage debut at the age of eight. 

Anders is best known in Great Britain for her part in the Yugoslav-West German television series The White Horses, and is also remembered for playing several roles in the German TV series Derrick.

Personal life
She had a daughter, Tatjana Leslie, with the actor Roger Fritz.

She appeared as one of 28 women under the banner We've had abortions! (Wir haben abgetrieben!) on the cover page of the West German magazine Stern on 6 June 1971. In that issue, 374 women publicly stated that they had had pregnancies terminated, which at that time was illegal.

Death
Her addictions with alcohol and drugs resulted in her death at 38. She died of heart failure in Haar, Bavaria, West Germany.

Selected filmography
 Max the Pickpocket (1962), as Brigitte Schilling
 Die Unverbesserlichen (1965–1967, TV series, 3 episodes), as Lore Scholz
 Der Forellenhof (1965, TV series, 8 episodes), as Christa Buchner
 How to Seduce a Playboy (1966), as Lucy
  (1966), as Anni Leithner
 The White Horses (1966, TV series, 13 episodes), as Julia
  (1967), as Angela
 Murderers Club of Brooklyn (1967), as Edna Cormick
 Tattoo (1967), as Gaby
  (1968), as Helga Arnold
  (1968), as Monika
  (Häschen in der Grube) (1969), as Leslie
 The Unnaturals (1969), as Elizabeth
 Our Doctor is the Best (1969), as Loni Vogt
 Der Kommissar: "Die Schrecklichen" (1969, TV series episode), as Herta Panse
  (1970), as Alice
 Der Kommissar: "Tod eines Schulmädchens" (1972, TV series episode), as Kirsten Benda
 Pan (1973)
 Derrick - Season 1, Episode 2: "Johanna" (1974, TV series episode), as Roswitha Meinecke
 The Clown (1976), as Sabine
 Tatort: "Kassensturz" (1976, TV series episode), as Renate Cand
  (1976), as Kimmi
 Das Blaue Palais, Episode 5: "Unsterblichkeit" (1976, TV series episode), as Yvonne
 Derrick - Season 4, Episode 2: "Hals in der Schlinge" (1977, TV series episode), as Heli
 Derrick - Season 5, Episode 2: "Tod eines Fans" (1978, TV series episode), as Vera Höfer
 Derrick - Season 5, Episode 7: "Kaffee mit Beate" (1978, TV series episode), as Beate Schill
 The Old Fox: "Teufelsbrut" (1979, TV series episode), as Christa Brückner
 Hurricane Rosy (1979), as Charlotte
 Derrick - Season 7, Episode 8: "Auf einem Gutshof" (1980, TV series episode), as Waltraud Heimann
 The Old Fox: "Bruderliebe" (1980, TV series episode), as Anita Will
 Derrick - Season 8, Episode 2: "Der Kanal" (1982, TV series episode), as Hannelore Junker
 Derrick - Season 11, Episode 13: "Der Klassenbeste" (1984, TV series episode), as Uschi
 Ein Fall für zwei: "Blutsbande" (1985, TV series episode), as Monika Brauer

References

External links
 
 Biographical information
 Short Biography 

1948 births
1986 deaths
Actors from Innsbruck
Austrian film actresses
Austrian television actresses
20th-century Austrian actresses